Calymenidius is an extinct genus of trilobites.

References

External links 
 Calymenidius at the Paleobiology Database

Fossils of Canada
Ptychopariida genera
Ptychoparioidea
Paleozoic life of Newfoundland and Labrador
Paleozoic life of Yukon